Castnia lecerfi is a moth in the Castniidae family. It is found in Argentina.

References

Moths described in 1913
Castniidae